Carriquiry is the surname of:
Alicia L. Carriquiry, Uruguayan statistician
Ana Claudia Carriquiry, Miss Mundo Uruguay in 1980
Guzmán Carriquiry Lecour, Uruguayan Roman Catholic activist
Natalia Carriquiry, Chilean rhythmic gymnast at the 2006 South American Games